Phyllophilopsis is a genus of flies in the family Tachinidae.

Species
Phyllophilopsis albifacies (Bigot, 1889)
Phyllophilopsis anomala (Townsend, 1939)
Phyllophilopsis caudata (Townsend, 1927)
Phyllophilopsis disgracilis Nihei & Dios, 2016
Phyllophilopsis dolichotarsis (Curran, 1934)
Phyllophilopsis evanida Reinhard, 1958
Phyllophilopsis fasciata (Curran, 1934)
Phyllophilopsis gracilis (Townsend, 1919)
Phyllophilopsis longipes (Thompson, 1968)
Phyllophilopsis longitarsus (Wulp, 1891)
Phyllophilopsis medinops (Townsend, 1934)
Phyllophilopsis neotropica (Townsend, 1927)
Phyllophilopsis nitens (Coquillett, 1899)
Phyllophilopsis pallidicornis (Bigot, 1889)
Phyllophilopsis similis (Townsend, 1934)
Phyllophilopsis tenuifrons Curran, 1934

References

Diptera of South America
Diptera of North America
Exoristinae
Tachinidae genera
Taxa named by Charles Henry Tyler Townsend